Persepolis was the first modern vessel serving in the Persian navy. A three-island iron-hulled vessel, it had two masts, one funnel and ram bow. Officially was rated as a cruiser, its type has been alternatively described as a gunboat or dispatch.

Commissioned in 1885, she served for decades and as of mid 1920s was not in active service. An American diplomat reported in 1925 that Persepolis and Mozaffari were the two largest vessels of Iran. Persepolis and Susa, formed the only two equipment in the navy as of 1904.

Construction and commissioning
Persepolis was built by German AG Weser at Bremen, on orders from Persian government. The shipbuilder assigned production number 75 to the vessel and launched it on 29 October 1884. She was acquired by Persia in 1885, having been delivered by German crew to her home in Khorramshahr. In his travel book A Ride to India across Persia and Baluchistan, Harry de Windt wrote that she cost Persia over £30,000.

Service history
Following being commissioned, most of the German crew were repatriated. According to Conway's All the World's Fighting Ships, she "spent most of her time at mooring, outwardly smart but rarely serviceable" because it was expensive for maintenance and its machinery was neglected. In  1925, the ship was discarded. She was scrapped about 1936.

See also
 List of former Iranian naval vessels

References

1885 ships
Naval ships of Iran
Ships built in Bremen (state)
World War I naval ships
Steamships
Military history of Qajar Iran